Gravitas Ventures is an independent film distribution company owned by Anthem Sports and Entertainment. The company was founded by Nolan Gallagher in Los Angeles, California in 2006 and moved its headquarters to Cleveland, Ohio in 2019. It focuses on the distribution of Independent feature films and documentaries.

History
Gravitas Ventures, an independent film distributor, was founded in Los Angeles, California by Nolan Gallagher in 2006. The company releases and promotes independent feature films and documentaries, offering films to theaters and as “Video on Demand” (VOD) to screening services such as Amazon Prime, Hulu, Paramount Plus, Apple iTunes, Vudu, Google Play, Vimeo, Netflix, and Gravitas Movies  The company has become one of the US's biggest providers of independent VOD. The company's films come in all forms: traditional movie theater, transactional VOD like traditional cable, telco, satellite and online platforms; subscription and ad-sponsored VOD. Gravitas releases around 400 films per annum; its library contains 2,400 titles.

The Los Angeles Business Journal recognized the company as the #3 fastest-growing private company in 2012, where it was #4 fastest-growing in 2011.  In 2019 the company moved its headquarters to Cleveland, Ohio.

In 2021 Gravitas Ventures’ film The Mole Agent was nominated for an Academy Award for Best Documentary.

2017 acquisition
In 2017, the content division of the German broadcast company ProSiebenSat.1, Red Arrow Entertainment, purchased a majority position in Gravitas with an agreement to move to complete ownership in the future. Gravitas remains independent, but works in cooperation with Red Arrow International, the company's distribution group. Red Arrow management said the combination of content generation, distribution and capacity to finance and own projects was motivation for the purchase. They planned to make “significant investments” in global film and television projects. Gravitas management and staff remained with the company.

2021 acquisition
On November 16, 2021, Gravitas was acquired by Canadian media company Anthem Sports & Entertainment for $73 million in a cash and stock deal.

Current 
In 2022, the new company released the horror movie All Eyes starring Jasper Hammer and Ben Hall and directed and written by the Greenlee brothers. The movie was produced by Homefront Pictures.

Premium video on demand
In 2020, the company entered into Premium Video on Demand (PVOD) offering, The Secret: Dare to Dream,  with Katie Holmes and John Lucas, inspired by Rhonda Byrne's popular 2006 best-selling novel. The company originally obtained North American rights to The Secret, which was scheduled for an April 17, 2020 theatrical release on a thousand screens. Gravitas mostly distributes movies through digital channels, though some films get released in theatrical venues nationwide. The COVID-19 pandemic and subsequent lockdowns closed theaters that spring, delaying The Secret’s release until July 2020, when it appeared as a PVOD on streaming services like Amazon, iTunes, Comcast and Vudu.

Other PVOD releases followed including Our Friend, starring Casey Affleck, Dakota Johnson and Jason Segel, and Queen Bees, starring Ellen Burstyn, Ann-Margret, Loretta Devine and James Caan. The company released The King's Daughter, starring Pierce Brosnan, Kaya Scodelario, Benjamin Walker, Fan Bingbing and William Hurt on January 21, 2022, exclusively in over 1000 theaters.

References 

2006 establishments in California
2021 mergers and acquisitions
American companies established in 2006
Anthem Sports & Entertainment
Companies based in Cleveland
Film distributors of the United States
Mass media companies established in 2006